William O. Wooldridge (August 12, 1922 – March 5, 2012) was a United States Army soldier and the first Sergeant Major of the Army.

Wooldridge served on active duty from 1940 to 1972. His military career spanned two wars and 14 campaigns, during which he was twice decorated for gallantry in action. He was sworn in as the first Sergeant Major of the Army on July 11, 1966.

Early life
William Wooldridge was born in Shawnee, Oklahoma, and grew up in Texas. He enlisted in the United States Army at Fort Worth, Texas on November 11, 1940.

Military career
Wooldridge served first with Company F, 23rd Regiment, 2nd Infantry Division. In December 1941 he was assigned to detached service with the British forces in Iceland. The following year, he was released from detached service and assigned to Company K, 26th Regiment, 1st Infantry Division when it arrived in England. He served with his division throughout World War II in an infantry rifle company, being promoted through the ranks to first sergeant. Wooldridge landed on D-Day as a squad leader (sergeant).

Wooldridge was awarded the Silver Star for gallantry at the Battle of Aachen in Germany in October 1944. He also received a Purple Heart for injuries in this battle. He was awarded a second Silver Star for gallantry during the Battle of the Bulge in December 1944, while serving as a platoon sergeant.

Wooldridge returned to Fort Sam Houston, Texas in May 1945. In October he was assigned to the Pacific Theater. After attending the 1st 3 Graders Course, Oahu Officer Troop and Staff School, at Schofield Barracks, Hawaii, he was assigned to Headquarters, Eighth United States Army, South Korea as a member of the occupation forces. In July 1948 Wooldridge was assigned as a platoon sergeant in the 26th Infantry Regiment, 1st Infantry Division, at Bamberg, Germany. He was promoted to first sergeant in Company K, 26th Infantry, 1st Infantry Division, in 1950.

In May 1954, Wooldridge returned to the United States as first sergeant of Company G, 3rd Infantry, at Fort McNair in Washington, D.C. He rejoined the 1st Infantry Division as first sergeant of Company D, 26th Infantry at Fort Riley, Kansas in December 1955. On December 20, 1956, he was appointed sergeant major of the 3rd Battalion, 26th Regiment. He left Fort Riley as sergeant major of the 2nd Battle Group, 28th Infantry Regiment, for duty in West Germany in December 1958, and became the 24th Infantry Division's sergeant major in March 1963.

Wooldridge returned to the 1st Infantry Division at Fort Riley as sergeant major of the 1st Brigade in February 1965. In June 1965 he was selected by the division commander, Major General Jonathan O. Seaman, as the division sergeant major. The next month he deployed with the division's advance party to South Vietnam. He served as division sergeant major until his selection as the first Sergeant Major of the Army in July 1966.

Sergeant Major of the Army
Wooldridge was chosen for the important new position of Sergeant Major of the Army from thousands of candidates. He served as Sergeant Major of the Army until September 1968. He is credited with improving the status of the non-commissioned officers by convening the first Major Command Sergeants Major Conference and recommending the Non-commissioned Officer Candidate Course, the Sergeants Major Academy, the Command Sergeant Major program, and a standardized non-commissioned officer promotion process. Wooldridge and General Harold K. Johnson, the Chief of Staff of the United States Army, worked together as an effective professional team. He came to revere Johnson, calling him "the finest officer I ever served with in my life".

After serving as Sergeant Major of the Army, Wooldridge returned to South Vietnam as sergeant major of the Military Assistance Command, Vietnam (MACV). He is the only Sergeant Major of the Army to return to field duty after serving in the top enlisted position.

Wooldridge's appointment was recorded in the Congressional Record of the 89th Congress Vol. 112, No. 110.

Controversy and PX scandal
In 1969, while command sergeant major of MACV, Wooldridge was accused in a congressional inquiry of fraud and corruption related to the military club system, amounting to more than $150 million annually. The inquiry found that then United States Army Provost Marshal General, Carl C. Turner had ignored Wooldridge's earlier theft and AWOL offenses that were notified to him at the time of Wooldridge's appointment as first Sergeant Major of the Army was announced in late 1966. Turner was later accused of having covered up an attempt by Wooldridge to smuggle 8-9 cases of liquor aboard General Creighton Abrams' KC-135 jet in April 1967. In late 1967 Turner ordered the United States Army Criminal Investigation Division that Wooldridge's name be removed from the list of soldiers being investigated into irregularities at the Non-commissioned officer (NCO) club at Fort Benning. Turner was also accused of having suppressed the Augsburg File which detailed the corruption of Wooldridge and other NCOs of the 24th Infantry Division in Augsburg, West Germany in the early 1960s. The subcommittee concluded that Turner had given Wooldridge and his associates immunity from investigation and "was grossly negligent in the performance of his official duties." 

Wooldridge together with American businessman William J. Crum arranged to have Sergeant William Higdon appointed as custodian of the NCO club system at Long Binh Post in November 1967. Higdon testified that between then and July 1968 Crum paid him a total of approximately US$60,000 of kickbacks from the slot machine operations. In August 1968 Wooldridge brokered a deal between Crum and Maredem Inc. (a company owned by Wooldridge, Higdon and Sergeant Hatcher, the custodian of the 1st Infantry Division NCO clubs) under which Maredem would have the monopoly on snack items in the NCO clubs while Crum would have the monopoly on slot machines. Maredem wanted to take control of all operations, but it recognized that Crum was too powerful and was capable of paying larger kickbacks than Maredem.

In 1973 the Department of Justice and Wooldridge reached an agreement whereby Wooldridge pleaded guilty to accepting stock equity from Maredem.

Wooldridge had earlier been awarded the Army Distinguished Service Medal, but it was revoked following this episode. In June Collins and Robin Moore's novel Khaki Mafia, a fictional character in a criminal cartel is based on Wooldridge in South Vietnam.

Later life
Wooldridge died in El Paso, Texas, on March 5, 2012, at the age of 89. He is buried at Fort Bliss National Cemetery in Section A, Lot 56.

Awards and decorations

References
The Sergeants Major of the Army, Daniel K. Elder, Center of Military History, United States Army Washington, D.C. 2003. Page 67.

External links
Wooldridge's Army career on the Association of the Army site
 
 

1922 births
2012 deaths
People from Shawnee, Oklahoma
Military personnel from Oklahoma
United States Army personnel of World War II
Recipients of the Legion of Merit
United States Army personnel of the Vietnam War
Recipients of the Silver Star
Recipients of the Croix de guerre (Belgium)
Recipients of the Air Medal
Sergeants Major of the Army